Kulwin is a locality in Victoria, Australia, located approximately 36 km to the east of Ouyen, Victoria.

Kulwin Post Office opened on 16 August 1920 when the railway arrived and closed on 19 November 1974.

Kulwin State School (No. 4375) opened in the Kulwin Soldiers' Hall on 8 January 1929. A standalone building, formerly at Nowingi State School, was re-erected and occupied in April 1933, with an additional workroom erected by parents in 1934. The school closed on 5 June 1950, with the building being removed to Robinvale Consolidated School.

References

Towns in Victoria (Australia)
Mallee (Victoria)